Bryan Young may refer to:

Bryan Young (politician) (1800–1882), Whig U.S. Representative from Kentucky
Bryan Young (cricketer) (born 1964), New Zealand cricketer
Bryan Young (bassoonist) (born 1974), American bassoonist and technology entrepreneur
Bryan Young (filmmaker) (born 1980), American filmmaker, author and blogger
Bryan Young (rugby union) (born 1981), Irish rugby union footballer
Bryan Young (ice hockey) (born 1986), Canadian ice hockey defenceman

See also
Brian Young (disambiguation)